Sabine Krein-Auer (born 2 October 1966) is a German former professional tennis player. She played under her maiden name Sabine Auer.

Biography
Born in Radolfzell, Auer competed on the professional tour in the 1980 and 1990s, reaching a best singles ranking of 125 in the world.

Auer's best performance on the WTA Tour was making the fourth round of the 1988 Lipton International Players Championships. Playing in the main draw as a qualifier, she defeated Iwona Kuczyńska, Amy Frazier and world number seven Hana Mandlíková, before being eliminated by Barbara Potter. In her upset win over Mandlíková she saved five match points in the second set.

She featured in the women's singles main draws at the 1988 French Open and 1989 Australian Open.

Now living in Saarland, Auer still plays tennis competitively on the ITF senior's circuit. She was the ITF Over 40s World Champion in 2009.

ITF finals

Singles (2–1)

Doubles (1–2)

References

External links
 
 

1966 births
Living people
West German female tennis players
German female tennis players
People from Radolfzell
Sportspeople from Freiburg (region)
Tennis people from Baden-Württemberg